Kristoffer Björklund (born April 19, 1978) is a former Swedish football player.

Career
After a weak start by Hammarbys first choice Rami Shaaban, Björklund jumped in and played surprisingly well. Later, when Rami Shaaban injured his knee, Björklund became the first choice for the rest of the 2008 season. After Shaaban's continued injurie problems, he rotated with Shaaban as first choice for Hammarby in 2009 season. Later on, Hammarby got relegated and "Poppen" left the club due to their economical problems.

Notes 

1978 births
Living people
Association football goalkeepers
Swedish footballers
IF Brommapojkarna players
Hammarby Fotboll players
AFC Eskilstuna players
Footballers from Stockholm